Hanoi Architectural University (other name: Hanoi University of Architecture) is the flagship university in architecture, planning, and civil engineering education and research in Vietnam. It was established in 1969 under the administration of Vietnam Ministry of Architecture (now is Vietnam Ministry of Construction). The school's predecessor is the Architecture Faculty of Hanoi University of Construction. Hanoi Architectural University is considered one of the best and largest universities in architecture, urban planning, and civil engineering in Vietnam. The school offers five-year bachelor's degrees (B.Eng. and B.Arch.), two-year master's degrees, and PhD degrees.

Organizations

Schools
School of Architecture
School of Urban and Regional Planning
School of Structural and Construction Engineering
School of Urban Infrastructure and Environmental Engineering
School of Urban Construction Management
School of Industrial Fine Arts

Departments 
Department of Marxist - Leninist Philosophy
Department of Postgraduate
Department of In-service Training

Research Institutes
 Institute of Tropical Architecture
 Center for Urban Infrastructure Technology 
 Center for Urban Research and Education
 Center for Construction and Project Management
 Center for Hydraulic Research
 Center for Environmental Studies

Other Centers
 Office of Consultancy and Construction Technology
 Construction and Urban Development, Inc.
 Library information center
 Service centers

References

Trường Đại học Kiến trúc Hà Nội

External links
 Official website

Architecture schools in Vietnam
Universities in Hanoi
Technical universities and colleges in Vietnam
Engineering universities and colleges in Vietnam